Norman Hoskins Giddy (13 June 1876 – 28 July 1909) was a cricketer who played first-class cricket for Border from 1898 to 1904.

The most notable performance of Giddy's cricket career came in a two-day non-first-class match in January 1899 for a Border XV against Lord Hawke's XI. It was the seventh match of Lord Hawke's XI's tour, and none of the local batsmen in the first six matches had reached 50 in an innings. After Border had made 84 in their first innings and conceded a first-innings lead of 210, Giddy went to the wicket at number nine in the second innings and in three quarters of an hour he made 66, hitting several balls out of the ground, out of a team total of 147.

Giddy worked as a customs clerk in Cape Town, where he died of pneumonia in July 1909, aged 33. He was unmarried.

References

External links
 
 

1876 births
1909 deaths 
South African cricketers
Border cricketers 
Sportspeople from Qonce
Deaths from pneumonia in South Africa